Jakub Bartosz (born 13 August 1996) is a Polish professional footballer who plays as a right midfielder for Puszcza Niepołomice.

Club career
On 11 August 2020, he joined Puszcza Niepołomice.

References

External links
 
  

1996 births
People from Myślenice
Sportspeople from Lesser Poland Voivodeship
Living people
Polish footballers
Poland youth international footballers
Poland under-21 international footballers
Association football midfielders
Wisła Kraków players
Sandecja Nowy Sącz players
Stal Mielec players
Puszcza Niepołomice players
Ekstraklasa players
I liga players